South Asian Canadians are Canadians who were either born in or can trace their ancestry to the Indian subcontinent, which includes the nations of India, Pakistan, Bangladesh, Nepal, Sri Lanka, Bhutan, and the Maldives.

The term South Asian Canadian is a subgroup of Asian Canadian and, according to Statistics Canada, can further be divided by nationality, such as Indian Canadian, Pakistani Canadian, and Bangladeshi Canadian. As of 2021, South Asians (7.1 percent) comprise the second largest pan-ethnic group in Canada after Europeans (69.8 percent).

According to the 2021 Canadian census, 2,571,400 Canadians had South Asian geographical origins, constituting approximately 7.1 percent of the total population and 35.1 percent of the total Asian Canadian population. This makes them the largest visible minority group in Canada comprising 26.7 percent of the visible minority population, followed by Chinese and Black Canadians respectively.

The largest South Asian Canadian communities are found in the provinces of Ontario, British Columbia and Alberta, while metropolitan areas with large populations include Toronto (1,182,485), Vancouver (369,295), Calgary (153,200), Edmonton (123,340), and Montréal (121,260). Over half (60.3 percent) of South Asian Canadians live in two metropolitan areas as of 2021; Greater Toronto and Metro Vancouver.

Terminology
The term "Asian" in Canadian English generally refers to people from East and Southeast Asia. This differs from the British English definition of Asian, which includes South Asia but excludes East and Southeast Asians terming them as Oriental or East Asian instead. Thus, the term South Asian has come into common usage referring to Asians hailing from the Indian subcontinent. This includes countries such as India, Nepal, Pakistan, Bangladesh, Sri Lanka, Bhutan, and the Maldives. It does not include nations such as Afghanistan and Myanmar, which have been considered South Asian in some other connotations of the term.

Canadians from South Asia may also be identified by their country of origin such as Indian or Pakistani. They may also be identified by their specific cultural backgrounds, for example Punjabi or Tamil. The term "East Indian" was a historical term used widely in Canada to refer to people hailing from India as opposed to Aboriginal peoples who are also sometimes referred to as "Indian". This term has been made less common after the introduction of the general term "South Asian" in areas with significant Indian Canadian populations like Toronto.

Brown and Desi are also terms used to refer to Canadians from South Asia. However, these are avoided in more formal contexts due to their ambiguity and the possibility of being seen as derogatory.

Statistics Canada lists both cultural backgrounds like Bengali, Gujarati, Tamil, Malayali, and Goan in addition to cultures like East Indian, Bangladeshi, Sri Lankan, and Pakistani.

History

Late 19th century 
The first known record of Canadians from South Asia dates back to 1897, when Punjabi Sikh soldiers arrived in British Columbia while transiting from India to the United Kingdom during the Diamond Jubilee of Queen Victoria.

Early 20th century 

With an estimated population of 100 by 1900, further South Asian settlement waves to Canada occurred in the few years after the turn of the 20th century; after hearing stories about the high wages being paid in British Columbia, some Punjabi British Indian soldiers stationed in Hong Kong and other British-controlled Chinese cities emigrated to Canada and settled in the western province. Attracted by these wages, more Sikh men began immigrating into British Columbia, working mainly in industries such as mining, logging and railroads. Many of these men, who arrived without their families, settled in Greater Vancouver, Vancouver Island, interior BC, northern BC, and the Fraser Valley in what is now Abbotsford, British Columbia.

A notable moment in early South Asian Canadian history was in 1902 when Punjabi Sikh settlers first arrived in Golden, British Columbia to work at the Columbia River Lumber Company. These early settlers built the first Gurdwara (Sikh Temple) in Canada and North America in 1905, which would later be destroyed by fire in 1926. 

In 1907, the government in British Columbia enacted laws limiting the rights and privileges of Canadians from South Asian countries, which prevented them from voting and denied them access to holding political office, public sector jobs and other professions, which prompted many to migrate south from Vancouver across the border to the United States, where some became the victims of the 1907 Bellingham riots. In early 1908, the Continuous journey regulation was enacted in an effort to prevent South Asians from immigrating to Canada. The law required that people arriving from South Asia in Canada must "come from the country of their birth or citizenship by a continuous journey and or through tickets purchased before leaving their country of their birth or nationality." This prevented Indian soldiers stationed in Hong Kong and Japan from immigrating to Canada.

The second Gurdwara to be built in Canada was in 1908 in Kitsilano (Vancouver) and aimed at serving a growing number of Punjabi Sikh settlers who worked at nearby sawmills along False Creek at the time. By the end of 1908, 5,209 Canadians were from South Asia, nearly all of whom were Punjabi settled across British Columbia. Many South Asian Canadians soon began to face discrimination and xenophobia from those of European (Anglo-British) background, experiencing similar treatment to the East Asian Canadian community, such as the Japanese and Chinese. European settlers viewed Asian settlers, and included the Indians, as a threat to the European nature of Canada. In addition, many Asian migrants had to work for lower wages, which agitated the European (Anglo-British) majority of the time.

By 1911, the third Gurdwara to be built in Canada opened in Abbotsford, British Columbia. Built in 1911, the Gur Sikh Temple was designated as a national historic site of Canada in 2002 and is the oldest existing Gurdwara in the country, as the Golden temple built in 1905 was destroyed by fire in 1926, and the Kitsilano temple built in 1908 would later close and be demolished in 1970, as the temple society relocating to the newly built Gurdwara on Ross Street, in South Vancouver. Later, the fourth Gurdwara to be built Canada was established in 1912 in Victoria on Topaz Avenue, while the fifth soon followed at the Fraser Mills (Coquitlam) settlement in 1913. 

A notable example of early anti-South Asian sentiments as a result of continuous journey regulation in Canada was the Komagata Maru incident. A successful Punjabi fisherman living in British Columbia attempting to circumnavigate the continuous journey regulation chartered a Japanese steamship known as the Komagata Maru to travel from Kolkata, India to Vancouver, British Columbia, Canada. The ship made stops in Hong Kong, Shanghai and Yokohama, where it picked up more Eastern-Caucasian settlers. In total the ship carried 376 passengers, of whom 337 were Sikh, 27 were Muslim and 12 were Hindu. All passengers originated from the Punjab and were registered as British subjects. Upon arriving in Vancouver though the ship was not permitted to dock with several British Columbian politicians such as Conservative MP Henry Herbert Stevens campaigning against their right to dock. 

Some South Asian Canadians already settled in Canada began launching 'shore committees' led by Husain Rahim (Gujarati-Canadian), Muhammad Akbar (Punjabi-Canadian) and Sohan Lal Pathak. These were to protest against the decision not to allow the settlers on the Komagata Maru no to enter Canada. Passengers threatened to start a rebellion, or ghadar, if they were forced back to India. The shore committee raised $22,000 and launched a test case legal battle in the British Columbia Court of Appeal. On July 6, the court unanimously decided they had no authority to interfere with the Department of Immigration and Colonization and had ordered the harbor tug Sea Lion to pull the ship out to sea on July 19. This resulted in rioting between the settlers on board and police officers. The ship was ultimately forced back to India on July 23, with only 20 of the settlers being allowed to stay in Canada.

With most Punjabi Sikhs continuing to seek employment in the forestry industry, at various sawmills across British Columbia, more Gurdwaras continued to be built, including one at the Queensborough (New Westminster) settlement in 1919, soon followed by another at the Paldi (Vancouver Island) settlement, also in 1919.

Mid-20th century 

The continuous journey regulation provision remained in effect until 1947, as did most other anti-South Asian laws. However pressure from the community resulted in the Canadian government allowing the wife and children of their Canadian husband/father to immigrate. However, a population stagnation ensued and by the mid-1920s the South Asian population in Canada stood at just over 1,000 persons. Despite their declining numbers, Canadians from South Asia grew wealthier. They began to acquire their own lumber mills which were used to produce wood and sawdust for consumer purchase. During the Great Depression the tight-knit nature of the South Asian community mitigated many of the economic effects the depression had on other communities in Canada.

South Asian Canadians were granted the right to vote in 1947. Furthermore, as a result of the recent independence of several South Asian nations such as India, Pakistan and Ceylon, now known as Sri Lanka, the Canadian government created annual immigration quotas which were to allow 150 Indians, 100 Pakistanis, and 50 Sri Lankans the right to immigrate to Canada each year.

In 1950, 25 years after settling in Canada and nine years after moving to British Columbia from Toronto, Naranjan "Giani" Singh Grewall became the first individual of South Asian ancestry in Canada and North America to be elected to public office after successfully running for a position on the board of commissioners in Mission, BC against six other candidates.Grewall was re-elected to the board of commissioners in 1952 and by 1954, was elected to became mayor of Mission. 

A millwright and union official, and known as a sportsman and humanitarian philanthropist as well as a lumberman, Grewall eventually established himself as one of the largest employers and most influential business leaders in the northern Fraser Valley, owned six sawmills and was active in community affairs serving on the boards or as chairman of a variety of organizations, and was instrumental in helping create Mission's municipal tree farm. With strong pro-labour beliefs despite his role as a mill-owner, after a scandal embroiled the provincial Ministry of Forestry under the-then Social Credit party government, he referred to holders of forest management licenses across British Columbia as Timber Maharajahs, and cautioned that within a decade, three or four giant corporations would predominantly control the entire industry in the province, echoing similarities to the archaic zamindar system in South Asia. He later ran unsuccessfully for the Co-operative Commonwealth Federation (the precursor of today's New Democratic Party) in the Dewdney riding in the provincial election of 1956. 

While by the 1950s, South Asian Canadians had gained respect in business in British Columbia primarily for their work in owning sawmills and aiding the development of the provincial forestry industry, racism still existed especially in the upper echelons of society. As such, during the campaign period and in the aftermath of running for MLA in 1956, Grewall received personal threats, while the six mills he owned along with his house were all set ablaze by arsonists. One year later, on July 17, 1957 while on a business trip, he was suspiciously found dead in a Seattle motel, having been shot in the head. Grewall Street in Mission was named in his honour.

Beginning in the 1960s racial and national restrictions were removed from Canada's immigration policies resulting in the explosive growth of South Asian community. The South Asian Canadian community grew from just 6,774 in 1961 to 67,925 just ten years later in 1971. 

Many of the South Asians arriving during the 1970s were not directly from South Asia but instead from Southeast Africa. Discrimination in many African Great Lakes nations like Kenya, Uganda and Tanzania against Indians was growing as a result of their status as a market-dominant minority. This is when a minority group controls a disproportionately large segment of the economy due to their over representation in business and above average education. One notable incident of this was Ugandan dictator Idi Amin's expulsion of 80,000 Ugandan Indians as part of his economic war to allow indigenous Ugandans to regain control of the countries economy. As a result, nearly 20,000 Indians fled to Canada, some directly others after temperately settling in other nations in Africa. They eventually grew to be the first sizable non-Sikh South Asian community in Canada. Shenaaz Nanji's Governor General's Award-nominated novel Child of Dandelions deals with the expulsion of Indians from Uganda and their immigration to Canada.

Around this time the Caribbean, mainly from Guyana and Trinidad and Tobago, and Indo-Fijians began immigrating to Canada as well, settling mainly in Toronto, Ontario. Many of these South Asians were the descendants of indentured laborers were brought by the colonial British government to replace the slaves on plantations. After completing their work terms the majority remained in these countries. Many of the immigrants who arrived from the Caribbean, the African Great Lakes and Fiji were educated professionals who upon arriving in Canada worked in the service sector or began their own businesses. As opposed to the industrial sector which mainly early Sikhs worked in.

Late 20th century 
Prior to the wide-scale urbanization of the South Asian Canadian community, the most statistically significant populations existed across rural British Columbia; a legacy of previous waves of immigration and settlement patterns that existed earlier in the 20th century through until the latter quarter of the century, as Punjabi Canadians continued to seek employment in the provincial forestry sector at sawmills throughout Vancouver Island and the interior. During the period between 1981 and 1996, small towns including Fort St. James (South Asians formed 22 percent of the total population), Quesnel (14 percent), Lake Cowichan (13 percent), Merritt (13 percent), Williams Lake (12 percent), Tahsis (10 percent), 100 Mile House (10 percent), Golden (9 percent), Squamish (9 percent), and Lillooet (9 percent) had the largest South Asian concentrations in Canada.

Starting in the 1980s South Asians arriving directly from the Indian subcontinent began to increase noticeably as well. In 1985 around 15,000 immigrants arrived from South Asia annually in 2012 that number was at 46,000 annually. In addition to the South Asians still arriving from other parts of the world like the Gulf of Arabia, Caribbean, the African Great Lakes and Fiji. As a result, the South Asian community began forming growing enclaves particularly in the Vancouver and Toronto area. Some notable areas are Gerrard Street, Brampton and several neighborhoods in Mississauga, Scarborough, Markham and Etobicoke in the Greater Toronto Area. In British Columbia notable South Asian districts include South Vancouver, Surrey, Delta and Abbotsford. 

In 1986, following the British Columbia provincial election, Moe Sihota became the first Canadian of South Asian ancestry to be elected to provincial parliament. Sihota, who was born in Duncan, British Columbia in 1955, ran as the NDP Candidate in the riding of Esquimalt-Port Renfrew two years after being involved in municipal politics, as he was elected as an Alderman for the city of Esquimalt in 1984. 

The rise of the Khalistan movement, the secessionist movement that sought to make the Indian state of Punjab a separate nation for Sikhs. As a result, during the 1980s many Sikhs living in Canada began to involve themselves in the Khalistan movement by organizing protests in Canada and sending money to fund separatist groups back in India. These protests reached their peak in 1984 when the Indian army raided the Golden Temple which were followed by the assassination of Indira Gandhi by her Sikh bodyguards and finally anti-Sikh riots throughout North India. Several major anti-Indian protests occurred in Calgary, Vancouver and Toronto with angry protesters forcing their way into the Indian embassy in Toronto carrying knives and smashing photos of Indira Gandhi. On June 23, 1985, several Canadian Sikhs led by Talwinder Singh Parmar were arrested for the Air India Flight 182 bombing, which killed 329 people. It is considered the worst terrorist attack to ever be carried out by Canadians.

With the outbreak of the Sri Lankan civil war in 1983 many Sri Lankan Tamils were forced to flee persecution and violence and see refuge in Canada. This made Sri Lankan Canadians the fifth largest source of immigrants during the 1990s. It also made Canada home to One of the largest Tamil population in the Western World with 140,000 Tamils living in Canada, primarily Toronto and Montreal. The Liberation Tigers of Tamil Eelam, or Tamil Tigers, though officially recognized as terrorist group in Canada still receives widespread support among the Sri Lankan Tamil Canadian community.

In 1990, Baltej Singh Dhillon, a Canadian Sikh challenged the traditional dress code of the RCMP in order to accommodate his turban, a mandatory article of clothing worn by many Sikh men. The caused controversy with opponents arguing that the uniform of the RCMP was a national icon to be preserved, while proponents pointed out that Sikh soldiers served in the British army during World War I and World War II and also served in many Canadian police forces. On March 16, 1990, the policy was amended to include Sikhs to serve while wearing a turban.

21st century 

Beginning in the 21st century the makeup of Canadians from South Asia had changed greatly. Sikhs had gone from making up nearly 90% of Canadian South Asians during much of the early−mid 20th century to just 28% in 2001. This is as a result of a more diverse background of South Asians immigrating to Canada as opposed to the primarily Sikh and Punjabi immigrants of the early 20th century. In 2006 total South Asian Canadians outnumbered the specific numbers of Chinese Canadians as the largest visible minority group in Canada with 25% of visible minorities. On February 24, 2000 Ujjal Dosanjh became the first Canadian of South Asian origin to become provincial premier, after being appointed premier of British Columbia, representing the New Democratic Party.

During the first decade of the 21st century India remained the second largest source of invited immigrants behind China but ahead of the Philippines. Pakistan was also among the top ten sources of invited immigrants to Canada. In addition, India is also the second largest source of foreign students in Canada with 28,939 invited Indian students studying in Canada in 2012 compared with 1,747 in 2000. In 2007, BAPS Shri Swaminarayan Mandir Toronto opened in Toronto, making it the largest Hindu temple in Canada. The Aga Khan Museum is also currently under construction by Ismaili Muslims hailing from Pakistan. Several other notable places of worship have been built by Canadians from South Asia including the Khalsa Darbar Gurdwara and Baitul Islam mosque.

South Asian Canadian culture also began to move into the Canadian mainstream in the 21st century. Bhangra music, a genre of music from India that combines traditional Punjabi music with pop and hip hop and other Western musical styles has grown increasingly popular throughout Canada. Canadians of all backgrounds enjoy and are also familiar with Bollywood. In 2011 the 12th International Indian Film Academy Awards were hosted in Toronto, which was home to nearly 832,000 Canadians of South Asian ancestry, one of the largest in the Western World. How to Be Indie, a Canadian children's television program produced by YTV, revolves around the daughter of Hindu Indian immigrants living in Toronto, and has since been syndicated in the United States, United Kingdom, Israel, Latin America and elsewhere. The Indian Canadian comedian Russell Peters has used his heritage as material for many of his jokes.

In the 2015 Canadian federal election, 16 South Asian Members of Parliament (MPs) were elected from Ontario alone, which is the most in Canadian history. Four South Asian ministers have been appointed to the Canadian cabinet, which includes the Minister of National Defence, Harjit Sajjan.

Demography

Population 

The first confirmed reports on the Canadians from India were in 1908 which put the East-Indian Canadian population at 5,209. The overwhelming majority of whom were Sikh, male, and settled in British Columbia. However, as a result of laws which restricted the immigration the community had declined to only 1,100 by the mid-1920s. By 1961, right before racial restriction were respectfully removed from Canada's immigration policy, Canadians from South Asian countries rose to 6,774. With racial quotas being removed (invitations extended) during the 1960s the number of Canadians from South Asia created the diverse population we see into the present day.

According to the 2016 National Household Survey 1,963,330 Canadians had South Asian origins and 1,924,635 other Canadians were classified as belonging to the visible minority group, generally termed, South Asian. The growth of the population is attributed to sustained invitations of immigration from South Asian nations. According to a 2011 study conducted by Statistics Canada Canadians from South Asia will grow to between 3.2 and 4.1 million by 2036 or 8.7% to 9.1% of the Canadian population overall.

National origins 

Note: Totals exceed 100% due to multiple origin responses.

Religion 

Until the 1950s, Sikhs formed up to 95% of the entire South Asian Canadian population. 

The 1981 Canadian census found that the religious breakdown of Canadians with South Asian ancestry was 31.5% Sikhism, 27.2% Hinduism, 21% Islam, 15.2% Christianity, 3.1% Irreligion, 0.5% Buddhism, 0.1% Judaism, 0.01% Baháʼí, and 0.1% other.

The 2001 Canadian census found that the religious breakdown of Canadians with South Asian ancestry was 29.7% Sikhism, 28.4% Hinduism, 23.2% Islam, 13.6% Christianity, 3.3% Irreligion, 0.9% Buddhism, 0.3% Zoroastrianism, 0.3% Jainism, 0.1% Judaism, 0.1% Indigenous, and 0.1% other.

A report detailing the religious proportion breakdown of the South Asian Canadian community was done between 2005 and 2007 by Statistics Canada, with results derived from the 2001 Canadian census and a following survey which found that Canadians of South Asian ancestry were 28% Sikh, 28% Hindu, 22% Muslim and 16% Christian, and 4% irreligious. Other religious such as Jainism, Buddhism, and Zoroastrianism practiced by Canadians of South Asian heritage formed the remaining 2%. The irreligious proportion of 4% among South Asian Canadians is statistically significant, as this figure climbs to approximately 17% when surveying all Canadians.

The 2011 Canadian census found that the religious breakdown of Canadians with South Asian ancestry was 29.1% Hinduism, 28.5% Sikhism, 24.5% Islam, 11.8% Christianity, 4.3% Irreligion, 1.1% Buddhism, 0.1% Judaism, and 0.6% other. This marked the first time in census records where Sikhs did not form the largest religious group amongst Canadians with South Asian ancestry. 

Religious affiliation in the South Asian Canadian community varies greatly based on national background. Based on the Statistics Canada report done between 2005 and 2007 with results derived from the 2001 Canadian census, Indo-Canadians are split between Sikhs (34%) and Hindus (27%), Muslims (17%), Christians (16%), Irreligious (4%), with Jains, Buddhists, and Zoroastrians forming the remaining 2%. The majority of Pakistani Canadians (90%) and Bangladeshi Canadians (87%) profess to follow Islam, while the majority of Sri Lankan Canadians are Hindu (64%) with a significant minority following Christianity. Nepalese Canadians tend to mostly follow Hinduism with few of them following Buddhism. Additionally, religious distributions among certain South Asian Canadian ethnic groups also vary; 80% of Tamil Canadians are adherents of Hinduism, a large majority of Punjabi Canadians (86%) are Sikh,  while most Bengali Canadians (74%) are Muslim.

Religion is found to play an important part in the lives of many Canadians from South Asia and serves as defining point in their identity, as with many people. Religious institutions such as gurdwaras, mosques, mandirs, koils and churches have often serve as points for the community. Religion can also play an important role in the marriage of some young Canadians from South Asia (who were born in Canada or in a country from South Asia). Some families believe that the couple must share the same religious heritage, which may also include caste, although this is becoming outdated. In recent years, Canadians from South Asia have opened private schools in order to preserve their religious heritage (as with Catholic schools), though the greatest majority attend government run schools.

More recently in 2013 the Quebec Soccer Federation had banned Sikh players in turbans from participating in matches, citing that turbans were a health hazard, though it is practised in India. This move created controversy among the Sikh community in Canada and condemned by FIFA.

{| class="wikitable" style="text-align:right"
|+ South Asian CanadiansDemography by Religion (1981−2021)
|-
| rowspan=2 |
! style="text-align:center;" colspan="2"|2021
! style="text-align:center;" colspan="2"|2011
! style="text-align:center;" colspan="2"|2001
! style="text-align:center;" colspan="2"|1991
! style="text-align:center;" colspan="2"|1981
|-
!Population
!%
!Population
!% 
!Population
!% 
!Population
!% 
!Population
!% 
|-
| style="text-align:left"|  Hinduism
| 768,785
| 
| 455,840
| 
| 260,535
| 
| 120,585
| 
| 53,490
| 
|-
| style="text-align:left"|  Sikhism
| 761,960
| 
| 447,330
| 
| 272,220
| 
| 134,790
| 
| 61,785
| 
|-
| style="text-align:left"|  Islam
| 595,085
| 
| 383,365
| 
| 212,805
| 
| 90,890
| 
| 41,310
| 
|-
| style="text-align:left"|  Christianity
| 245,035
| 
| 185,345
| 
| 124,320
| 
| 54,960
| 
| 29,760
| 
|-
| style="text-align:left"| Irreligion
| 156,855
| 
| 67,405
| 
| 30,610
| 
| 12,095
| 
| 6,045
| 
|-
| style="text-align:left"| Buddhism
| 27,885
| 
| 17,685
| 
| 8,630
| 
| 2,960
| 
| 1,020
| 
|-
| style="text-align:left"| Jainism
| 8,100
| 
| N/A
| N/A
| 2,385
| 
| N/A
| N/A
| N/A
| N/A
|-
| style="text-align:left"| Zoroastrianism
| 3,630
| 
| N/A
| N/A
| 2,900
| 
| N/A
| N/A
| N/A
| N/A
|-
| style="text-align:left"| Judaism
| 1,270
| 
| 1,105
| 
| 660
| 
| 70
| 
| 100
| 
|-
| style="text-align:left"| Baháʼí
| 440
| 
| N/A
| N/A
| 400
| 
| 80
| 
| 15
| 
|-
| style="text-align:left"| Indigenous
| 115
| 
| N/A
| N/A
| 585
| 
| N/A
| N/A
| N/A
| N/A
|-
| style="text-align:left"| Other
| 2,240
| 
| 9,325
| 
| 1,025
| 
| 3,865
| 
| 105
| 
|-
| style="text-align:left"|Total responses
| 2,571,400 
| 
| 1,567,400
| 
| 917,075
| 
| 420,295 
| 
| 196,395
| 
|-
| style="text-align:left"|  Total South AsianCanadian Population
| 2,571,400
| | 1,615,920| | 963,190| | 505,515 
| | 223,235| |}

 Language 
 Knowledge of language 
Many South Asian Canadians speak Canadian English or Canadian French as a first language, as many multi-generational individuals do not speak South Asian languages as a mother tongue, but instead may speak one or multiple as a second or third language. 

According to the 2021 census, South Asian languages with the largest number of speakers in Canada include Hindustani (1,176,295 persons or 3.2 percent of the national population), Punjabi (942,170 persons or 2.6 percent), Tamil (237,890 persons or 0.7 percent), Gujarati (209,410 persons or 0.6 percent), Bengali (120,605	persons or 0.3 percent), Malayalam (77,910 persons or 0.2 percent), Telugu (54,685 persons or 0.2 percent), Marathi (35,230 persons or 0.1 percent), and Sinhalese (33,050 persons or 0.1 percent).

 Mother tongue 

 Generation status 
A large minority of Canadians are made up of first generation individuals, numbering 8,219,555 people and forming 23.85% of the national population as of the 2016 Canadian census. In comparison with the nation-wide statistics, as of the 2016 Canadian census, a majority of the South Asian Canadian community was made up of first generation individuals, numbering 1,330,745 people and forming 67.78% of the total South Asian Canadian population. 

Similarly, a large minority of Canadians are also made up of second generation individuals, numbering 6,100,720 people and forming 17.70% of the total national population as of the 2016 Canadian census. In comparison with the nation-wide statistics, as of the 2016 Canadian census, a large minority of the South Asian Canadian community was made up of second generation individuals, numbering 559,415 people or 28.49% of the total South Asian Canadian population.

A narrow majority of Canadians are made up of third or more generation individuals, numbering 20,139,790 people and forming 58.44% of the total national population as of the 2016 Canadian census. In comparison with the nation-wide statistics, as of the 2016 Canadian census, a small minority of the South Asian Canadian community was made up of third or more generation individuals, numbering 34,470 people or 1.76% of the total South Asian Canadian population.

 Geographical distribution 
 Provinces & territories 

According to the 2021 census provinces with the largest South Asian Canadian populations include Ontario (1,515,295 persons or 10.8 percent of the total population), British Columbia (473,970 persons or 9.6 percent), Alberta (297,650 persons or 7.1 percent), Quebec (127,995 persons or 1.5 percent) and Manitoba (71,215 persons or 5.5 percent).

Canadian provinces and territories by their ethnic South Asian population as per the 2001 Canadian census, 2006 Canadian census, 2011 Canadian census, 2016 Canadian census, and 2021 Canadian census below. 

With immigration restrictions for non-European origin ethnocultural groups lifting during the 1960s, the South Asian Canadian population witnessed rapid growth in the mid-late 20th century, increasing from 67,925 persons or 0.3% of the total Canadian population in 1971 to 723,345 persons or 2.5% of the total Canadian population in 1996; this growth was primarily attributed to mass immigration. 

Attributed to the large increase in immigration during the era, Ontario overtook British Columbia by 1971 as the province with the largest population of individuals with South Asian ancestry in Canada. The South Asian population in Ontario grew from 30,920 persons in 1971 to 427,470 persons by 1996; in British Columbia from 18,795 persons in 1971 to 165,010 persons by 1996. 

During the same era, British Columbia would continue to be the province with the largest proportion of South Asian Canadians, increasing from 0.9% in 1971 to 4.5% by 1996, while the South Asian Canadian share of the total population in Ontario grew from 0.4% in 1971 to 4.0% by 1996.

Canadian provinces and territories by their ethnic South Asian population as per the 1971 Canadian census, 1981 Canadian census, 1986 Canadian census, 1991 Canadian census and 1996 Canadian census below.

Immigration restrictions prior to the 1960s severely limited South Asian population growth in Canada. British Columbia was the only province to have notable populations during the early-to-mid 20th century, peaking in 1908 with approximately 5,209 persons, forming 1.6% of the provincial population. 

Tightened immigration restrictions, heightened racial tensions, along with migration to the United States or a return to the subcontinent prompted a population decline in the following years; the 1911 census counted 2,292 persons of South Asian ancestry in British Columbia, comprising 0.6% of provincial population. 

This was followed by another population decline in the ensuing 10 years with 951 persons of South Asian ancestry in British Columbia or 0.2% of the total population in 1921. During the ensuing 30 years, a population stagnation followed by a slow gradual increase in the South Asian Canadian population principally stemmed from natural growth, as immigration from the subcontinent has been essentially halted since 1908 due to the Continuous journey regulation. 

In the 1950s, country quotas were introduced and permitted sponsorship of relatives, thus resulting in the first relatively major increase in the South Asian Canadian population since prior to 1908.

Canadian provinces and territories by their ethnic South Asian population as per the 1911 Canadian census, 1921 Canadian census, 1931 Canadian census, 1941 Canadian census, 1951 Canadian census, and 1961 Canadian census below. 

 Metropolitan areas 

According to the 2021 census, metropolitan areas with large South Asian Canadian communities include Toronto (1,182,485), Vancouver (369,295), Calgary (153,200), Edmonton (123,340), Montréal (121,260), Winnipeg (63,805), and Ottawa (60,780).

Canadian metropolitan areas by their ethnic South Asian population as per the 2011 Canadian census, 2016 Canadian census, and 2021 Canadian census below.

 Subdivisions 
According to the 2016 census, subdivisions with the largest South Asian Canadian communities include Brampton, Ontario (44.3%), Surrey, British Columbia (32.8%), Abbotsford, British Columbia (25.5%), Mississauga, Ontario (23.2%), Milton, Ontario (21.0%), Ajax, Ontario (20.9%) and Delta, British Columbia (20.3%).

Source: Canada 2016 Census
National average: 5.6%'Note: Subdivisions shown below have South Asian Canadian populations above the national average.

 Alberta 

Chestermere (14.3%)
Calgary (9.5%)
Edmonton (9.5%)
Wood Buffalo (7.0%)

 British Columbia 

Surrey (32.8%)
Abbotsford (25.5%)
Delta (20.3%)
Cawston (11.7%)
Oliver (8.8%)
New Westminster (8.3%)
Burnaby (8.1%)
Mission (7.8%)
Richmond (7.3%)
Squamish (6.8%)
Vancouver (6.0%)
Merritt (5.8%)
View Royal (5.8%)

 Historical 

 Manitoba 
Thompson (7.5%)

 Ontario 

Brampton (44.3%)
Mississauga (23.2%)
Milton (21.0%)
Ajax (20.9%)
Markham (17.8%)
Pickering (15.2%)
Toronto (12.6%)
Whitchurch-Stouffville (12.4%)
Vaughan (10.1%)
Caledon (10.0%)
Oakville (8.9%)
Richmond Hill (7.7%)
Whitby (6.6%)
Waterloo (6.4%)
Cambridge (6.2%)

 Québec 

Dollard-des-Ormeaux (11.2%)
Vaudreuil-Dorion (6.4%)

 Saskatchewan 

Regina (5.8%)

 Immigration 
For much of the early 20th century restrictions such as the continuous journey regulation and quotas were placed on people immigrating from the countries of South Asia to prevent them from immigrating to Canada. When these restrictions were removed in the 1960s immigration from the Indian subcontinent and other places like the African Great Lakes, the Caribbean and Fiji gradually increased. As of 2012, India was the third largest source of immigrants for Canada behind the Philippines and China respectively. Pakistan was the fourth, Sri Lanka the seventeenth, Bangladesh the nineteenth and Nepal the thirty-eighth. In addition immigrants to Canada arrive from regions such as the Arab States of the Persian Gulf, the Caribbean and the African Great Lakes (as well as European countries). Historically, British Columbia was the traditional destination for Punjabi immigrants. Beginning in the 1970s, however, Ontario grew to become the top destination due to its job availability. In recent years migration to Alberta has also increased due to its comparatively stronger economy and better job market.

See also
 Indo-Canadians
 Pakistani Canadians
 Bangladeshi Canadian
 Nepalese Canadians
 Sri Lankan Canadians
 Tamil Canadians

References

Further reading
 Moulton, Edward C. "South Asian Studies in Canada, and the Shastri Indo-Canadian Institute." Pacific Affairs'', University of British Columbia. Vol. 51, No. 2 (Summer, 1978), pp. 245–264

Ethnic groups in Canada